Bikini Hotel is a campy comedy released in 1997 that aired on Cinemax. It was written by Dom Magwili and directed by Jeff Frey. The film features a visual gag based on the 50 ft woman and a cat fight in the miniature golf sequence. The tagline used for all marketing was "Our Maids Never Turn Down a Bed!"

Plot
Samantha Vance, played by J. J. North, inherits the run-down Tiki Hotel when her father dies. She decides to fix it up but has problems drumming up business. Her friends throw a party at the hotel and it becomes clear that she can make money if she turns it into the "Bikini Hotel" with all of the staff members wearing bikinis. This elicits jealousy in Jacqueline Renee, played by Tina-Desiree Berg, and her boss, Gail Regent, played by Stella Stevens, who run the adjacent Regent Hotel. They want to turn Samantha's hotel into a parking lot. It all culminates in a miniature golf competition in which the winner keeps the Bikini Hotel. Julie Strain makes an appearance as Jacqeline Renee's spy Raquel.

Reception 
The film became a cult classic, spawning a host of bikini business movies. Femme Fatales magazine published a production diary that featured actress Tina-Desiree Berg as the centerfold (Pam Anderson issue, Volume 4, number 8).

References

External links
 Bikini Hotel at IMDb
 trailer

1990s sex comedy films
1997 films
Teen sex comedy films
1997 comedy films